Dewan people is the label for ethnic  . In Sikkim it is a name of the kirat Dewan people only.

References

Social groups of Nepal